Ancient North Arabian (ANA) is a collection of scripts and possibly a language or family of languages (or dialects) related to Old Arabic that were used in north and central Arabia and south Syria from the 8th century BCE to the 4th century CE.

Classification 
Many scholars believed that the various ANA alphabets were derived from the ASA script, mainly because the latter was employed by a major civilization and exhibited more angular features. Others believed that the ANA and ASA scripts shared a common ancestor from which they both developed in parallel. Indeed, it seems unlikely that the various ANA scripts descend from the monumental ASA alphabet, but that they collectively share a common ancestor to the exclusion of ASA is also something which has yet to be demonstrated.

The hypothesis that all ANA alphabets derive from a single ancestor gave rise to the idea that the languages which these scripts express constitute a linguistic unity, a so-called ANA language. As a hypothetical language or group of languages, Ancient North Arabian forms one branch of the North Arabian group, the other being Proto-Arabic. They are distinguished from each other by the definite article, which in Arabic is ʾal-, but in ANA is h-. They belong to a different branch of the Semitic languages than the Ancient South Arabian languages.

The validity of this hypothesis has been called into question. This is particularly the case for Taymanitic, which has been determined to be a Northwest Semitic language. Safaitic and Hismaic are also now considered forms of Old Arabic due to shared features.

Geographical distribution 
The Ancient North Arabian scripts were used both in the oases (Dadanitic, Dumaitic, Taymanitic) and by the nomads (Hismaic, Safaitic, Thamudic B, C, D, and possibly Southern Thamudic aka Thamudic F) of central and northern Arabia.

Varieties

Dadanitic 

Dadanitic was the alphabet used by the inhabitants of the ancient oasis of Dadan (Biblical Dedān, modern Al-`Ula in north-west Saudi Arabia), probably some time during the second half of the first millennium BC.

Dumaitic 
Dumaitic is the alphabet which seems to have been used by the inhabitants of the oasis known in antiquity as Dūma and later as Dumat Al-Jandal and al-Jawf. It lies in northern Saudi Arabia at the south-eastern end of the Wādī Sirḥān which leads up to the oasis of Azraq in north-eastern Jordan. According to the Assyrian annals Dūma was the seat of successive queens of the Arabs, some of whom were also priestesses, in the eighth and seventh centuries BC.

Hasaitic 

Hasaitic is the name given to the inscriptions — mostly gravestones — which have been found in the huge oasis of Al-Hasa in north-eastern Saudi Arabia at sites like Thāj and Qatīf, with a few from more distant locations. They are carved in what may be an ANA dialect but expressed in a slightly adapted form of another member of the South Semitic script family, the Ancient South Arabian alphabet.

Hismaic 

Hismaic is the name given to the Old Arabic texts carved largely by nomads in the Ḥismā desert of what is now southern Jordan and north-west Saudi Arabia, though they are occasionally found in other places such as northern Jordan and parts of northern Saudi Arabia outside the Ḥismā. They are thought to date from roughly the same period as the Safaitic, i.e. first century BC to fourth century AD, though there is even less dating evidence in the case of Hismaic.

Safaitic 

Safaitic is the name given to the alphabet and variety of Old Arabic used by tens of thousands of ancient nomads in the deserts of what are now southern Syria, north-eastern Jordan, and northern Saudi Arabia. Occasionally, Safaitic texts are found further afield, in western Iraq, Lebanon, and even at Pompeii. They are thought to have been carved between the first century BC and the fourth century AD, though these limits can be no more than suggestions based on the fact that none of the approximately 35,000 texts known so far seems to mention anything earlier or later than these limits.

Taymanitic 

Taymanitic is the name given to the variety of Northwest Semitic and ANA script used in the oasis of Tayma. This was an important stopping point on the caravan route from South Arabia to the Levant and Mesopotamia. The Taymanitic alphabet is probably mentioned as early as c. 800 BC when the regent of Carchemish (on what is now the Turkish-Syrian border) claimed to have learned it. About the same time an Assyrian official west of the Euphrates reported that he had ambushed a caravan of the people of Taymāʾ and Sabaʾ (an ancient South Arabian kingdom, Biblical Sheba) because it had tried to avoid paying tolls. There are two Taymanitic inscriptions dated to the mid-sixth century BC, since they mention the last king of Babylon, Nabonidus (556–539 BC), who spent ten years of his seventeen-year reign in Taymāʾ.

Thamudic 

Thamudic is a name invented by nineteenth-century scholars for large numbers of inscriptions in ANA alphabets which have not yet been properly studied. It does not imply that they were carved by members of the ancient tribe of Thamūd. These texts are found over a huge area from southern Syria to Yemen. In 1937, Fred V. Winnett divided those known at the time into five rough categories A, B, C, D, E. In 1951, some 9000 more inscriptions were recorded in south-west Saudi Arabia which have been given the name 'Southern Thamudic'. Further study by Winnett showed that the texts he had called 'Thamudic A' represent a clearly defined script and language and he therefore removed them from the Thamudic 'pending file' and gave them the name 'Taymanite', which was later changed to 'Taymanitic'. The same was done for 'Thamudic E' by Geraldine M.H. King, and this is now known as 'Hismaic'. However, Thamudic B, C, D and Southern Thamudic still await detailed study.

Table of letters

Unicode

Old North Arabian script was added to the Unicode Standard in June 2014 with the release of version 7.0.

The Unicode block for Ancient North Arabian is U+10A80–U+10A9F:

See also
Nabataean alphabet

Notes

Literature
Lozachmeur, H., (ed.), (1995) Presence arabe dans le croissant fertile avant l'Hegire (Actes de la table ronde internationale Paris, 13 novembre 1993) Paris: Éditions Recherche sur les Civilisations. 
Macdonald, M.C.A., (2000) "Reflections on the linguistic map of pre-Islamic Arabia" Arabian Archaeology and Epigraphy 11(1), 28–79
Scagliarini, F.,  (1999) "The Dedanitic inscriptions from Jabal 'Ikma in north-western Hejaz" Proceedings of the Seminar for Arabian Studies 29, 143-150  
Winnett, F.V. and Reed, W.L., (1970) Ancient Records from North Arabia (Toronto: University of Toronto)
Woodard, Roger D. Ancient Languages of Syria-Palestine and Arabia. Cambridge University Press 2008.

 
Languages attested from the 8th century BC
Arabic languages
History of the Arabian Peninsula
Semitic languages
Obsolete writing systems
Right-to-left writing systems